John David Waihee III (born May 19, 1946) is an American politician who served as the fourth governor of Hawaii from 1986 to 1994. He was the first American of Native Hawaiian descent to be elected to the office from any state of the United States. After his tenure in the governor's office, Waihee became a nationally prominent attorney and lobbyist.

Education
Waihee was born in Honokaa on the Island of Hawaii. Upon graduating from Hawaiian Mission Academy, Waihee attended classes at Andrews University in Michigan. There he obtained his Bachelor of Arts degrees in both business and history. He moved to Honolulu to attend the newly established William S. Richardson School of Law at the University of Hawaii at Mānoa. He obtained his Juris Doctor degree in 1976. Waihee is an Eagle Scout and recipient of the Distinguished Eagle Scout Award.

Politics
Waihee started his political career as a delegate to the 1978 Hawaii State Constitutional Convention where he was instrumental in the creation of the Office of Hawaiian Affairs and the adoption of the Hawaiian language as an official language of the state. He later served one term as a Democratic member of the Hawaii State House of Representatives from 1981 to 1983. Waihee was elected lieutenant governor of Hawaii under Governor George Ariyoshi, serving in that capacity until 1986. In 2008 Waihee served as a delegate to the Democratic National Convention.

In 2011, Waihee was appointed by Governor Neil Abercrombie to the Native Hawaiian Roll Commission, established by Act 195. Waihee sits as the only Commissioner At-Large. In the following year, the Native Hawaiian Roll Commission actively began working on fulfilling its mandate to bring the Native Hawaiian people together by enrolling with the Commission. This effort is now referred to as Kanaʻiolowalu.

Commissioner Waihee is featured in an 11-part series of Frequently Asked Questions videos about Kanaʻiolowalu. The video footage was recorded on the campus of the William S. Richardson School of Law in the presence of a live audience composed primarily of law school students and faculty.

He pushed the state of Hawaii to adopt Hawaiian as an official language. He's proud of helping build Kapolei as Oahu's second city.

Governorship

Waihee successfully ran for the governor's office sharing a ticket with state senator Ben Cayetano. Cayetano became Waihee's lieutenant governor for two terms; both were re-elected in 1990. During much of his term, Hawaii experienced a boom in the tourism industry and increased foreign investment, especially from Japan. The issue of Hawaiian sovereignty also took on increased importance as the centennial anniversary of the overthrow of the Kingdom of HawaiʻiI (when Queen Liliuokalani was deposed) occurred. Waihee left office in 1994, having served the maximum two terms in office as permitted by the Constitution of Hawaii that he had helped to author. His lieutenant governor won the election to succeed Waihee.

Retirement

After leaving the governor's office, Waihee worked for various national-scope law firms based in Washington, DC. He also opened a private law practice and lobbying firm. In two special elections held in November 2002 and January 2003, Waihee considered running for the United States House of Representatives seat left open by the death of Patsy Mink on September 28, 2002. Under Hawaiian election law, it was too late to remove the name of Patsy Mink from the November 2002 General Election ballot, and consequently Mink was posthumously re-elected. Waihee dropped out of both special election contests and endorsed the candidacy of Mink's widower.

See also
 List of first minority male lawyers and judges in Hawaii
 List of minority governors and lieutenant governors in the United States

References

External links

|-

|-

|-

|-

1946 births
Living people
American lobbyists
Andrews University alumni
Democratic Party governors of Hawaii
Lieutenant Governors of Hawaii
Democratic Party members of the Hawaii House of Representatives
Native Hawaiian people
Native Hawaiian politicians
People from Hawaii (island)
William S. Richardson School of Law alumni